The 1946–47 Yugoslav Ice Hockey League season was the sixth season of the Yugoslav Ice Hockey League, the top level of ice hockey in Yugoslavia. Four teams participated in the league, and Mladost have won the championship.

Standings

References

External links
Yugoslav Ice Hockey League seasons

Yugo
Yugoslav Ice Hockey League seasons
1946–47 in Yugoslav ice hockey